Total Nonstop Deletion was a professional wrestling special event episode of Impact Wrestling produced by Total Nonstop Action Wrestling. It took place on December 15, 2016, at the Hardy Compound in Cameron, North Carolina. The event included special appearances by The Rock 'n' Roll Express, Road Warrior Animal, ODB, Disco Inferno, Swoggle and The Bravado Brothers among other independent wrestling tag teams from CWF Mid-Atlantic.

Background
On October 9, during an Impact Wrestling taping, Matt Hardy first announced that TNA would be holding an entire episode of Impact Wrestling from his home in Cameron, North Carolina, entitled "Total Nonstop Deletion." The center piece of the episode was revealed to be an open tag team invitational, Hardy would go on to invite then WWE Raw Tag Team Champions The New Day as well as ROH Tag Team Champions and IWGP Junior Heavyweight Tag Team Champions The Young Bucks, offering to appear on both ROH and WWE programming in exchange.

Filming, however, would become postponed due to the legal issues between then TNA President Billy Corgan and the company. Corgan would lose his injunction on TNA, which had prevented filming of any kind on October 31, allowing filming for Total Nonstop Deletion to commence later that week. During the buildup for Total Nonstop Deletion, Matt Hardy would make a surprise appearance at Ring of Honor's Final Battle, issuing a challenge to The Young Bucks.

Results

Tag Team Apocalypto

Aftermath
The Hardy Compound was once again used for a match in March 2018. "Woken" Matt Hardy, as he later became known in WWE, took on Bray Wyatt in a pre-taped episode called "The Ultimate Deletion" that aired on Raw.

References

External links
 Official website
 

2016 in professional wrestling
Impact Wrestling shows
Professional wrestling in North Carolina
2016 in North Carolina
Events in North Carolina
December 2016 events in the United States